Ihor Myhalatiuk is a Ukrainian retired footballer. Known for his performances for Bukovyna Chernivtsi and Chornomorets Odesa. He also spent most of his career at Enerhetyk Burshtyn and Enerhetyk Burshtyn. He has played over 400 official matches with Ukrainian teams during the years of independence.

Career
Igor Migalatyuk is a graduate of the Chernivtsi Sports School Bukovyna Chernivtsi, his professional career began in 1994 in his native Bukovyna Chernivtsi. He made his debut in the Premier League of Ukraine on June 19 of the same year in a match against Ternopil Niva. In 1996 he joined the Moldovan Olympia. At the end of the season Igor returned to Bukovyna Chernivtsi, where he lost until the summer of 2001.

In connection with the unsuccessful 2000/01 season, in which Bukovyna Chernivtsi took the last place in the first league, Migalatyuk, like a number of other players, left his native club and immediately received an invitation to Odessa in Chornomorets Odesa, with which he won silver first league awards and registration for the next season in the major league of Ukraine. He also played in clubs: Nyva Vinnytsia, Spartak Ivano-Frankivsk. In winter 2007 he moved to Desna Chernihiv, the main club of Chernihiv. In summer 2007 he moved to Enerhetyk Burshtyn, where he played more than 150 matches in the first league of Ukraine. In the summer of 2009, he returned to his native team, where he played one season and ended his playing career. In total, he played over 200 matches for Bukovina (189 - the championship, 13 - the Cup).

After retirement
Since 2015 he has been working on the Chernivtsi TV channel as a commentator for Bukovyna Chernivtsi's home matches.

Personal life
He is married and has two daughters.

Honours
Chornomorets Odesa
 Ukrainian Second League: 2009–10

Chornomorets Odesa
 Ukrainian First League: 2001–02

Bukovyna Chernivtsi
 Ukrainian Second League: 1999–2000

References

External links 
 Ihor Myhalatiuk at footballfacts.ru
 Ihor Myhalatiuk at allplayers.in.ua

1976 births
Living people
FC Desna Chernihiv players
FC Halychyna Drohobych players
FC Bukovyna Chernivtsi players
CSF Bălți players
FC Chornomorets Odesa players
FC Chornomorets-2 Odesa players
FC Nyva Vinnytsia players
FC Spartak Ivano-Frankivsk players
FC Enerhetyk Burshtyn players
Ukrainian Premier League players
Ukrainian First League players
Ukrainian Second League players
Ukrainian footballers
Ukrainian expatriate footballers
Expatriate footballers in Moldova
Ukrainian expatriate sportspeople in Moldova
Association football midfielders